Ursula Mary Niebuhr (August 3, 1907 – January 10, 1997) was an English American academic and theologian.  She was the founder and longtime head of the Department of Religion at Barnard College in New York City, USA.

She was born in Southampton, England.  After graduation from the University of Oxford with double Firsts in history and theology, she became the first woman to win a fellowship to the Union Theological Seminary in New York, USA.

Marriage
In 1931, the former Ursula Mary Keppel-Compton, the younger daughter of Dr. and Mrs. Keppel-Compton of Woodhall Spa in Lincolnshire, England and Rapallo in northern Italy, became the wife of Reinhold Niebuhr in Winchester, England.  The couple made New York City their home during the majority of their 40 years together.  The Niebuhrs had two children, Christopher Niebuhr and Elisabeth Niebuhr Sifton. The marriage, which lasted until his death in 1971, was said to have been marked by theological debates. Ursula Niebuhr left evidence in her professional papers at the Library of Congress showing that she co-authored some of her husband's later writings.

Career
As a lay minister in the 1930s, she was preaching in Anglican churches and raising questions about the role of women in the church.

Beginning as a lecturer in 1940, she was a member of the Barnard College faculty for twenty years, retiring in the 1960s.

Selected works

 1957 -- "A memorandum on certain reading and spelling difficulties for my academic colleagues, teachers, parents and anyone else." Westport, Connecticut: Orton Society.  
 1981 -- Remembering Niebuhr: letters of Reinhold and Ursula M. Niebuhr. San Francisco: Harper & Row.

Notes

References
 Thomas, Robert.  "Ursula Niebuhr, 89, Founder Of Barnard Religion Department," New York Times. January 12, 1997.

External links 
 Library of Congress:   Reinhold Niebuhr Papers:  Boxes 60-67    	Professional File of Ursula Niebuhr, 1913-1994
Reflections by Ursula Niehbuhr on the 100th anniversary of Reinhold Niebuhr's birth Retrieved April 15, 2013

American Episcopal theologians
Christian ethicists
Union Theological Seminary (New York City) alumni
Barnard College faculty
1908 births
1997 deaths
People from Southampton
English emigrants to the United States
People from Woodhall Spa
20th-century American Episcopalians